Joseph Harrison Conzelman (July 14, 1889 – April 17, 1979) was a pitcher in Major League Baseball. He played for the Pittsburgh Pirates.

References

External links

1889 births
1979 deaths
Major League Baseball pitchers
Pittsburgh Pirates players
Atlanta Crackers players
Indianapolis Indians players
Baseball players from Connecticut